The 2007 UCI Cyclo-cross World Championships – Men's under-23 race was held on Saturday 27 January 2007 as a part of the 2007 UCI Cyclo-cross World Championships in Hooglede-Gits, Belgium.

Summary 

Lars Boom attacked on the hard climb halfway the second lap and managed to create a serious gap by drilling himself through the 35-metre-long sand section just after the climb. His main opponent Niels Albert followed on a fair distance and could only secure his silver medal, finishing 1:22 behind Boom. Romain Villa followed 20 seconds behind Albert to take the bronze.

Ranking 

A total of six riders abandoned the race: Yves Corminboeuf (Switzerland), David Lozano Riba (Spain), Byron Munyoro (Zimbabwe), Otsuka Wataru (Japan), Julien Taramarcaz (Switzerland) and Erlantz Uriarte Okamika (Spain).

Notes

External links
 Union Cycliste Internationale

Men's under-23 race
UCI Cyclo-cross World Championships – Men's under-23 race
2007 in cyclo-cross